Pseudolilliconus kuiperi is a species of sea snail, a marine gastropod mollusk in the family Conidae, the cone snails and their allies.

Like all species within the genus Conus, these snails are predatory and venomous. They are capable of "stinging" humans, therefore live ones should be handled carefully or not at all.

Description
The size of the shell attains 5.9 mm.

Distribution
This marine species occurs off Oman.

References

 Moolenbeek R.G. 2006. Conus (Lilliconus) kuiperi spec. nov. (Gastropoda, Conidae), from the Sultanate of Oman. Basteria, supplement 3: 83–85

External links
 The Conus Biodiversity website
 

kuiperi
Gastropods described in 2006